Porphyrosela hardenbergiella is a moth of the family Gracillariidae. It is known from New Zealand, but may be adventive, since the host plant is Australian. The colony known to Wise has been destroyed since its discovery. This species was last collected in New Zealand in 1955 but as at 2019 was still not known from Australia.

The larvae feed on Hardenbergia species. They mine the leaves of their host plant.

References

Lithocolletinae
Moths of New Zealand
Moths described in 1957

Taxa named by Keith Arthur John Wise